Kedarkantha (Hindi: केदारकंठ) is a mountain peak of the Himalayas in Uttarakhand, India. Kedarkantha is located within Govind Wildlife Sanctuary in Uttarkashi district.

A trek to the peak of Kedarkantha usually starts from Sankri, a small village, and takes four days to complete.

There are several myths around Kedarkantha and Juda ka Talab, a high altitude lake.

References

Mountains of Uttarakhand
Geography of Uttarkashi district